Paul Petit (2 May 1893 – 24 August 1944) was a French writer, sociologist, diplomat and French Resistance worker.

Arrested on 7 February 1942, Paul Petit was deported to the prison Saarbrucken 9 July 1942. Sentenced to death on 16 October 1943, by 2 e Senate Volksgerichtshof, along with his co-accused Martin Marietta and Raymond Burgard, he was beheaded at the Cologne prison (Germany) on 24 August 1944.

Translations of Kierkegaard 

Petit produced French translations of the work of two works of the Danish philosopher Søren Kierkegaard: the Concluding Unscientific Postscript to Philosophical Fragments, published in 1941; and Philosophical Fragments, published posthumously in 1947.

References 

1893 births
1944 deaths
French sociologists
French Resistance members
French male non-fiction writers
20th-century French journalists
20th-century French male writers